Paddy O'Day is a 1936 American comedy-drama film directed by Lewis Seiler and released by 20th Century Fox. It stars Jane Withers, Pinky Tomlin, and Rita Hayworth (credited as Rita Cansino). The story follows the adventures of a plucky Irish girl who arrives at Ellis Island only to discover that her mother, a cook in a wealthy Long Island home, has died. Hiding from the immigration officers who want to deport her, she charms everyone she meets, including the service staff and reclusive young master of the house. She goes to live with a family of Russian dancers that she met on the ship, and performs with them in their nightclub. Withers uses a heavy Irish brogue for her character and sings one song with an Irish accent and another song with a Russian accent. She also dances in several numbers, while Hayworth performs a traditional Russian dance in a nightclub revue.

Plot
Eight-year-old Paddy O'Day, a friendly and spirited Irish girl, travels to America to join her mother, a cook for a wealthy family. Aboard ship she befriends the Petrovitch family of Russian dancers and performs a dance with them while trying to hide the fact that she has brought her dog, Tim, along. Upon arrival at Ellis Island, the immigration officials are informed that Paddy's mother has died and prepare to send her back to Ireland. To keep her calm, they tell her that her mother is very sick, and move her to a locked dormitory on the island. Paddy escapes from the dormitory and hides with her dog in an empty milk canister. The milk truck transports her to Manhattan, where she hops out and is bewildered by all the noise and traffic. A band of street urchins accost her and she beats up one of them with the help of her dog. She charms the policeman who chases away the boy and he gives her a ride on his motorcycle. Along the way he stops a car for speeding and tells the driver to take Paddy to Long Island so she can be reunited with her mother.

In the house where Paddy's mother worked, much effort is being made by the service staff to get Aunt Flora and Aunt Jane, two elderly and fussy spinsters, ready for a trip. The service staff decide to hide Paddy's presence from the family, who would otherwise report her to the immigration authorities. Dora the maid breaks the news to Paddy that her mother has died. Paddy's dog escapes and chases the aunts' cat Mathilda. Paddy finally collars Tim and hides in the room where Roy, the young reclusive master of the house, is examining his taxidermy collection of birds. Paddy charms Roy, and when Tim destroys one of Roy's models, he still likes her and agrees to conceal her presence from his aunts.

Tamara Petrovitch, Paddy's Russian friend from the ship, comes looking for Paddy with her brother Mischa, who owns a nightclub. They convince Roy to have Paddy live with them. Seeing the wealth of the property, Mischa tries to convince Roy to become a partner in his nightclub. Roy agrees and also falls in love with Tamara, composing and playing an original song for her. By the time the aunts return from their trip, Roy has changed from an eccentric recluse to a mustached, guitar-playing songster who wears a colorful Russian costume and has a liking for vodka. He has also switched his stuffed bird collection for live birds. His aunts are shocked, but Roy tells them his new friends have shown him how to live. Mischa's nightclub debuts with a stage show featuring Paddy singing and dancing in the song "I Like Balalaika" with a troupe of balalaika players, and Tamara dancing in a traditional Russian dance. Alerted by the aunts' private detective, Officer McGuire arrives to arrest and deport Paddy, but Roy announces that he and Tamara were secretly married the day before and that they will adopt her.

Cast
Jane Withers as Paddy O'Day
Pinky Tomlin as Roy Ford (listed as Ray Ford in the film credits)
Rita Cansino as Tamara Petrovitch
Jane Darwell as Dora
George Givot as Mischa
Francis Ford as Officer McGuire
Vera Lewis as Aunt Flora
Louise Carter as Aunt Jane
Russell Simpson as Benton

Production

Development
The film's working titles were The Immigrant, Immigrants, and The Little Immigrant. Fox executives originally intended this film to be a remake of the studio's 1931 film Delicious, although not many similarities remain.

Casting
Withers was making four or five films a year for Fox since her breakout role in the 1934 Shirley Temple vehicle Bright Eyes. However, before Paddy O'Day was released, she informed the studio that she would not continue to work unless her weekly salary was raised from $150 to $1,000. Fox complied with this demand. Withers showed off her talent for accents in the film, singing one song with an Irish accent and another song with a Russian accent.

Sixteen-year-old Rita Hayworth was credited as Rita Cansino in this, her fourth screen appearance. Her stage name would be changed to Rita Hayworth the following year. Hayworth performed her own dances in the film; her singing voice may or may not have been dubbed.

Music
Several original songs were composed for the film. They including "Keep That Twinkle in Your Eye" and "I Like a Balalaika", both with lyrics by Edward Eliscu and music by Harry Akst. "Changing My Ambitions", with lyrics and music by Pinky Tomlin and Coy Poe, was sung by Tomlin in the film.

Filming
Filming began in September 1935.

Release
The film was released on January 17, 1936. The official run time was 75–76 minutes.

In the 21st century, Fox reissued Paddy O'Day on its home video label, although the print was not re-mastered.

Critical reception
The Des Moines Register described Paddy O'Day as "one of the grandest laughfests of a year", combining comedy, romance, "some clever situations and good lines". It called out the performances of Withers, Tomlin, and Hayworth, as well as George Givot for his "merciless slaying of the English language". The Pittsburgh Sun-Telegraph called the film "unpretentious, yet constantly laughable … Not a strong story, not even an original idea, yet 'Paddy O'Day' has what it takes to keep an audience in high humor practically all of the way". A Turner Classic Movies review upon the film's reissue on home video called it "a charming, sweet film that stops short of being cloying. … The story, as directed by the underrated Lewis Seiler, moves fluidly along and features some clever comic build-ups and gags".

The San Francisco Examiner claimed that Withers' performance in Paddy O'Day surpassed all she had done to date. Calling her "an exceptionally clever little actress", it explained: "Jane Withers exudes personality. She is a vital, lovable little being, with a malleable face that can be equally tragic or comic". The Pittsburgh Post-Gazette wrote:
Jane is versatile. She uses a County Cork brogue more than an inch thick, then doubles in Russian. She sings, dances, talks with eyes, hands, feet and hair. She is about the personification of expression, all of it done to a purpose, the drawing of a child character that might spring from life. More than anything else, Jane is human: she might be the child that lives down the block.

The Turner Classic Movies review added to this: "Withers comes off as a relatable, realistically drawn, enthusiastic, average kid, and that is surely what cemented her appeal in Depression-era America".

Notes

References

Sources

External links

1936 films
American comedy-drama films
American black-and-white films
Films directed by Lewis Seller
1936 comedy-drama films
20th Century Fox films
1930s American films